Bahujan Samaj Party, Nepal (Majority Society Party, Nepal) is a Nepalese political party. It is inspired by the Kanshi Ram's Bahujan Samaj Party of India and led by Madan Bahadur Pradhan. In the 1999 general elections it had 3 candidates. The party got 0.01% of the votes nationwide. Right now its national president is Ganga Prasad Mahara.

See also 
Bahujan Samaj

References

Bahujan Samaj Party
Dalit politics
Political parties with year of establishment missing
Socialist parties in Nepal